Alexandru Vremea (born 3 November 1991) is a Moldovan professional footballer who plays as a midfielder for Zimbru Chișinău in the Moldovan National Division.

Club career
On 16 January 2018, Vremea signed for Petrocub Hîncești. After one season with the club, he signed for Liga III club Foresta Suceava on 1 February 2019. 

On 3 August 2019, he returned to Moldova, signing for his youth club Sfântul Gheorghe. On 8 January 2021, he left Sfântul Gheorghe after playing for the club for one and a half years.

On 19 March 2021, Vremea signed a one-year contract with Zimbru Chișinău, returning to the club he played for between 2014 and 2016.

International career
He made his debut for the Moldova national team on 7 June 2014 in a friendly against Cameroon.

Career statistics

Honours
Zimbru Chișinău
Moldovan Cup: 2013–14
Moldovan Super Cup: 2014

References

External links
 
 

1991 births
Living people
People from Ialoveni District
Moldovan footballers
Moldova youth international footballers
Moldova under-21 international footballers
Moldova international footballers
Association football midfielders
Moldovan Super Liga players
Liga I players
FC Sfîntul Gheorghe players
FC Academia Chișinău players
FC Zimbru Chișinău players
FC Politehnica Iași (2010) players
CS Petrocub Hîncești players
ACS Foresta Suceava players
Moldovan expatriate footballers
Expatriate footballers in Romania
Moldovan expatriate sportspeople in Romania